Julia Andrews Brownley (born August 28, 1952) is an American businesswoman and politician who has been the United States representative for California's 26th congressional district since 2013. A Democrat, she served in the California State Assembly from 2006 to 2012. Before her political career, she worked in marketing and sales.

Early life, education, and career
Brownley grew up in Virginia, and attended Fairfax Hall, a girls' boarding school in Waynesboro, for four years. Brownley received a bachelor's degree in political science from Mount Vernon College for Women of George Washington University in 1975 and a master's degree in business administration from American University in 1979.

Brownley served on the Santa Monica-Malibu Unified School District Board of Education from 1994 to 2006. During her time on the school board, she served three terms as president.

California State Assembly (2007–2013)

Elections
In 2006, Brownley ran for the California State Assembly in California's 41st Assembly district. She won a five-way Democratic primary with 35% of the vote and the general election with 62% of the vote. In 2008, she was reelected with 66% of the vote. In 2010, she was reelected to a third term with 59% of the vote. Brownley was term-limited in 2012, having served the maximum of three terms in the Assembly permitted under California law.

She was endorsed by the League of Conservation Voters.

Tenure
In 2010, Brownley authored a bill that would have banned all plastic shopping bags. It did not pass.

Committee assignments
Brownley served on the following California State Assembly committees:
Aging and Long-Term Care Committee
Education Committee (chair)
Higher Education Committee
Judiciary Committee
Legislative Budget Committee
Natural Resources Joint Legislative Budget Committee
Select Committee on Community Colleges

U.S. House of Representatives (2013–present)

Elections

2012 

In February 2012, Brownley announced her candidacy for California's 26th congressional district. The district had previously been the 24th district, represented by 13-term Republican Elton Gallegly. In the general election, Brownley defeated Republican state Senator Tony Strickland, 53%-47%. She was endorsed by Emily's List and Planned Parenthood.

2014 

Brownley was narrowly reelected over Republican state Assemblyman Jeff Gorell in the general election. She is a member of the Democratic Congressional Campaign Committee's Frontline Program, which is designed to help protect vulnerable Democratic incumbents. After Republican candidates garnered over 50% of the vote in the June blanket primary, the Cook Political Report changed the rating of the race from "Leans Democratic" to "Toss-up." The race did become close, making for closer scrutiny of the results. Initial results showed Brownley winning 51% to 49%, with about 4,000 votes separating the candidates.

Political positions
Brownley supports the DREAM Act, the Affordable Care Act, and same-sex marriage. She has advocated increased insurance company regulation, job training funds, toxic cleanup, and increased public education funding. Since her election to Congress, Brownley has voted with the Democratic Party 93% of the time. On November 19, 2015, she voted for HR 4038, legislation that would effectively halt the resettlement of refugees from Syria and Iraq to the United States.

As of November 2022, Brownley had voted in line with Joe Biden's stated position 100% of the time.

Committee assignments
Committee on Transportation and Infrastructure
Subcommittee on Aviation
Subcommittee on Coast Guard and Maritime Transportation
Subcommittee on Highways and Transit
Committee on Veterans' Affairs
Subcommittee on Economic Opportunity
Subcommittee on Health (Ranking Member)
Select Committee on the Climate Crisis

Caucus memberships
New Democrat Coalition
House Baltic Caucus
Congressional Arts Caucus
Blue Collar Caucus

Political positions

Abortion
Brownley opposed the 2022 overturning of Roe v. Wade, calling the decision "unprecedented, deeply disappointing, and ideologically driven."

Electoral history

2022

2020

2018

2016

2014

2012

Personal life
Brownley is divorced and has two children.

See also
 Women in the United States House of Representatives

References

External links

Congresswoman Julia Brownley official U.S. House website 
Julia Brownley for Congress campaign website
 

|-

1952 births
21st-century American politicians
21st-century American women politicians
Female members of the United States House of Representatives
Mount Vernon Seminary and College alumni
Government of Ventura County, California
Kogod School of Business alumni
Living people
Democratic Party members of the California State Assembly
Democratic Party members of the United States House of Representatives from California
People from Aiken, South Carolina
People from Santa Monica, California
School board members in California
Women state legislators in California